The Elk Fork is a tributary of Point Pleasant Creek,  long, in northwestern West Virginia in the United States.

The Elk Fork's entire course and watershed are in Tyler County. It flows into Point Pleasant Creek from the east near the community of Kidwell.

See also
List of rivers of West Virginia

References 

Rivers of West Virginia
Rivers of Tyler County, West Virginia